Horwich may mean:

Horwich, a town in Greater Manchester
Horwich Parkway railway station
Horwich RMI F.C., the former name of an English football club
Horwich Works, a former locomotive works
LMS Horwich Mogul, a steam locomotive
Horwich End, a locality of Whaley Bridge in Derbyshire
Frances Horwich, a US children's television presenter
Paul Horwich, a British analytic philosopher at New York University